The following list includes settlements, geographic features, and political subdivisions of New Jersey whose names are derived from Native American languages.

Listings

Counties
 Passaic County

Settlements

 Absecon
 Acquackanonk Township
 Allamuchy Township (Lenape: Alemuchink)
 Alloway Township
 Almonesson (part of Deptford Township))
 Apshawa (part of West Milford)
 Atsion Village
 Batsto Village
 Cheesequake (part of Old Bridge Township) (Lenape: Chiskhakink)
 Cinnaminson Township
 Communipaw
 Cohansey Township
 Conaskonk Point (part of Union Beach) (Lenape: Kwënàskunk)
 Crosswicks
 Croton (part of Delaware Township)
 Cupsaw (part of Ringwood)
 Espanong (part of Jefferson Township)
 Hackensack
 Hoboken (Lenape: Hupokàn)
 Hockhockson (part of Tinton Falls)
 Ho-Ho-Kus
 Hopatcong
 Locktown (part of Delaware Township)
 Lopatcong Township
 Macopin
 Mahwah
 Manahawkin
 Manalapan Township
 Mannington Township
 Mantoloking
 Mantua Township
 Matawan
 Metuchen
 Navesink
 Neshanic
 Netcong
 Normanook (part of Sandyston Township)
 Nummytown (part of Middle Township)
 Old Tappan
 Packanack Lake
 Pahaquarry Township
 Paramus
 Parsippany
 Passaic
 Peahala Park (part of Long Beach Township)
 Peapack-Gladstone
 Pennsauken Township
 Pequannock
 Perth Amboy
 Piscataway Township
 Pohatcong Township
 Pompton Lakes
 Pompton Plains
 Pompton Township
 Preakness
 Rahway
 Raritan
 Raritan Township
 Repaupo (part of Logan Township)
 Rockaway 
 Rockaway Creek 
 Rockaway River 
 Rumson
 Secaucus
 Shamong Township
 Sicomac
 Singac (part of Little Falls)
 South Amboy
 Squankum (part of Howell Township and also the original name of Williamstown)
 Succasunna
 Teaneck
 Totowa
 Towaco
 Tuckahoe (Lenape: Takeho)
 Walpack Township
 Wanamassa
 Wanaque
 Watchung
 Weehawken
 Weehawken Cove
 Weequahic
 Weequahic Park
 Wenonah
 Whippany
 Wickatunk (part of Marlboro Township) (Lenape: Wikwètunk)

Bodies of water

 Absecon Inlet
 Absecon Island
 Alexauken Creek (tributary of the Delaware River in Hunterdon County) (Lenape: Alàxhakink)
 Assunpink Creek (Lenape: Ahsën'pink)
 Assiscunk Creek
 Lake Atsion
 Batsto River
 Campgaw Mountain
 Capoolong Creek (tributary of South Branch Raritan River)
 Cheesequake State Park
 Chincopin Branch (tributary of the Manumuskin River in Cumberland County)
 Chingarora Creek
 Cohansey River
 Crosswicks Creek
 Cupsaw Lake
 Cushetunk Mountain
 Hakihokake Creek (tributary of Delaware River in Hunterdon County)
 Hockhockson Swamp
 Lake Hopatcong
 Iosco (part of Bloomingdale)
 Lake Iosco
 Kittatinny Mountains (Lenape: Kitahtëne)
 Lamington
 Lamington River
 Loantaka Brook
 Lockatong Creek
 Luppatatong Creek
 Macanippuck Run (tributary of Delaware River in Cumberland County) (Lenape: Mèkënipèk)
 Machesautauxen Creek, alternate name for the Sleeper Branch (tributary of Mullica River)
 Mahoras Brook
 Manapaqua Branch (stream in Ocean County)
 Manasquan
 Manasquan River (Lenape: Mënàskunk)
 Manantico Creek
 Mannington Creek
 Manumuskin River
 Manunka Chunk (location on the border of White Township and Knowlton Township) (Lenape: Mënànkahchunk)
 Mashipacong Island (river island in the Delaware River)
 Matchaponix Brook
 Mattano Park
 Metedeconk River
 Mingamahone Brook (tributary of the Manasquan River in Monmouth County)
 Minisink
 Mount Mohepinoke (located on the border of Liberty Township and White Township)
 Moonachie
 Moosepac Pond (located in Jefferson Township)
 Muksukemuk, native name for Deep Voll Brook
 Mulhockaway Creek (a tributary of the South Branch Raritan River via Spruce Run in Hunterdon County)
 Musconetcong Mountain
 Musconetcong River
 Muskee Creek (tributary of the Maurice River in Cumberland County)
 Muskingum Brook (tributary of the Batsto River via Springers Brook in Burlington County)
 Musquapsink Brook
 Nacote Creek (tributary of the Mullica River in Atlantic County)
 Nantuxent Creek
 Navesink River
 Nescochague Creek
 Neshanic River
 Nishisakawick Creek and Little Nishisakawick Creek (tributaries of the Delaware River in Frenchtown, Hunterdon County)
 Nihomus Run (tributary of the Salem River in Salem County)
 Nishuane Brook (tributary of the Second River in Essex County)
 Nomahegan Brook (tributary of the Rahway River in Union County)
 Normanook Brook alt. Normanock Brook (tributary of Big Flat Brook in Sandyston Township, Sussex County)
 Oranoaken Creek
 Packanack Mountain
 Papakating Creek
 Pascack Brook
 Pascack Valley
 Passaic River
 Patcong Creek (tributary of Great Egg Harbor in Atlantic County)
 Paunpeck Creek (tributary of the Hackensack River via Cromakill Creek in North Bergen, Hudson County)
 Peckman River
 Pennsauken Creek
 Pequest River
 Picatinny Arsenal
 Pochuck Creek
 Pochuck Mountain
 Pohatcong Creek
 Pohatcong Mountain
 Pompeston Creek (tributary of the Delaware River in Burlington County)
 Pompton River
 Pophandusing Brook (tributary of the Delaware River in Warren County)
 Preakness Range
 Rahway River
 Ramapo Mountains
 Ramapo River
 Rancocas Creek
 Raritan Bay
 Raritan River
 Sanhickan, native name for the falls of the Delaware River at Trenton
 Shabakunk Creek, West Branch Shabakunk Creek, and Little Shabakunk Creek
 Shannoc Brook (tributary of Toms River in Ocean County)
 Shipetaukin Creek (feeder stream of the D&R Canal in Mercer County)
 Mount Tammany
 Tantomwom, the native name for Long Hill.
 Tulpehocken Creek
 Upper Pohatcong Mountain
 Waackaack Creek alt. Waycake Creek (tributary of Raritan Bay in Monmouth County –its name is given to the Waackaack Rear Range Light)
 Wagaraw Brook
 Wagaraw Mountain
 Wampum Brook (tributary of Shrewsbury River in Monmouth County)
 Wanaque River
 Watchung Mountains
 Warinanco Park
 Watnong Mountain (located in Parsippany-Troy Hills)
 Watsessing Park
 Watsessing River
 Waughaw Mountain (located in Montville Township)
 Wawayanda Creek
 Wawayanda Mountain
 Wawayanda State Park
 Weamaconk Creek (tributary of Matchaponix Brook in Monmouth County)
 Wemrock Brook (tributary of Matchaponix Brook via Weamaconk Creek in Monmouth County)
 Wesickaman Creek (tributary of the Mullica River in Burlington County)
 Westecunk Creek
 Whippany River
 Wickecheoke Creek
 Windbeam Mountain (located in Ringwood)
 Yantacaw Brook (tributary of the Third River in Montclair, Essex County)
 Yantacaw Brook Park

See also
 List of place names of Native American origin in the United States

References

Citations

Sources

 Beauchamp, William Martin (1906). Aboriginal place names of New York. New York State Education Department, New York State Museum.
 Bright, William (2004). Native American Place Names of the United States. Norman: University of Oklahoma Press.
 Campbell, Lyle (1997). American Indian Languages: The Historical Linguistics of Native America. Oxford: Oxford University Press.
 Ruttenber, Edward Manning.  History of the Indian tribes of Hudson's River: their origin, manners and customs, tribal and sub-tribal organizations, wars, treaties, etc., etc. J. Munsell, (1872)

External links
 Indian Place Names in New Jersey

 
New Jersey
 
Native American-related lists